Looking Back in Anger was a 1989 Hong Kong TV series and one of the most watched TVB series by Chinese people in Hong Kong, Southeast Asia and around the world. Many factors contributed to the success of this series. As well as its tragic but memorable storyline, the series featured a strong cast, with Felix Wong, Deric Wan (who rose to fame with his role as the main antagonist), Carina Lau, Kathy Chow Hoi-Mei and Maggie Shiu. The popular theme song of the series "Yat sang ho kau" (一生何求) was sung by Danny Chan and later by Deric Wan himself.

In 2022, the drama was selected as one of ten classic TVB dramas being honoured for a new joint Youku and TVB programme.

Cast
Felix Wong as Alex Ting Yau Kin and Ting Wing Cheung, Kin and Hong’s father
Deric Wan as Ben Ting Yau Hong, Kin's brother and the series’ main antagonist 
Yammie Lam as Mui Fan Fong, Kin and Hong’s mother
Soh Hang-suen as Aunt Wan (Yip Sau Wan), Cheun’s wife and the adoptive mother of Kin and Hong
Maggie Shiu as Chiu Kar Mun, Hong's girlfriend and later fiancee
Kathy Chow as Connie Lee Wah, Kin's first girlfriend
Carina Lau as Sandy Ngai Chor Gwun, Kin’s friend, later girlfriend and then wife
Kwan Hoi-san as Ngai Kwan, Gwun’s father, a business tycoon and Fong Sai Bong’s business rival
Lee Shing-cheung as Michael Fung Yiu Kwok, Bong’s elder son
Cheng Gwun-meen as Martin Chu Siu Shan
Elliot Ngok as Henry Fung Sai Bong, father of Michael, Sam and Cindy
Felix Lok as Mr. Szeto
Bowie Wu as Lee Ho Cheun, Wan’s husband
Ng Kai Ming as Sam Fung Yiu Ming, Bong’s younger son
Gregory Lee as young Ting Yau Kin (in the 1960's)
Kong Ngai as Lee Lap, Wah's father
Spencer Leung as Chow Zhi Mun
Carrie Ho as Chan Siu Ling
Frankie Lam as Rich classmate 1
Mak Cheung-ching as Rich classmate 2
Gilbert Lam as Mr Yeung
Michael Tao as Herman
Gallen Lo as Wong Kwok-Kei
Kiki Sheung as Cindy Fung Mei Yan, Bong’s daughter and later Hong’s wife
Lily Li as Miss Lam, Magazine Editor-in-Chief, Ngai Chor Gwun's former boss
Steve Lee as Toh Kum Siu 
Lau Sek-Ming as Francis Ngai Chun Kit, Gwan’s half-brother with whom she was very close to
Galen Yu as Yau Kwok Cheung
Cheng Kun Sin
Chan Lei Si as Fong Hung
Chu Sing Choi

Plot

The series starts with tycoon, Alex Ting Yau Kin (Felix Wong), waiting for a phone call. The entire story is then told in flashback.

1960s
Kin (Gregory Lee) was born into a poor family. Kin's father, Ting Wing Cheung (also played by Felix Wong) is a gambling addict much to the displeasure of his wife, Mui Fan Fong (Yammie Nam).

Fong is wrongfully accused of murder and sentenced to death. Cheung goes insane after his wife’s death.

Lee Ho Cheun (Bowie Wu) and his wife, Yip Sau Wan (So Hang Suen) adopts Kin and Hong.

Cheun suffers a fatal stroke soon after, leaving a financially destitute Wan to bring up the children.

1980s

Kin (Felix Wong) works multiple jobs to help Wan support the family. Wan takes in her brother-in-law’s daughter, Lee Wah (Kathy Chow).

In university, Hong befriends Sam Fung (Ng Kai Ming), the youngest son of Fung Sai Bong (Elliot Ngok), the prosecutor who convicted Fong. Kin meets heiress Ngai Chor Gwan (Carina Lau) on a tv show.

Hong manipulates Wah to do his assignments and starts pursuing Chiu Kar Mun (Maggie Shiu). Wah discovers Hong’s deception and stops helping him. Hong drops out of university to work for Bong. Kin and Wah become a couple.

Hong and Bong’s eldest son, Michael (Lee Seng Cheong), caused the death of Gwan’s brother, Kit (Canti Lau) over a business dispute. Hong manipulates Kin into taking the rap for him.

Kar Mun uses her uncle (Chu Tit Wo) in Malaysia to pressure Hong into marriage. Hong kills her and marries Bong’s daughter, Cindy (Kiki Sheung).

Kin is released from prison and starts a successful restaurant chain with his inmate friends. After breaking up with Wah, Kin and Gwan become a couple.

Wan finds incriminating evidence during her trip to Malaysia, forcing Hong to kill her. Kin manages to recover Wan’s body but Hong avoids extradition due to a legal loophole.

Cindy files for divorce and Hong loses his position in Bong’s company. Cindy resorts to drinking due to Hong’s constant harassment and dies before the divorce is finalized. Hong inherits her wealth.

Wah is paralyzed in a plane crash and commits suicide on the night of Kin and Gwan’s wedding.

Hong suffers major financial losses and becomes a fugitive. When attempting to rob his own family, Hong fell down an elevator shaft after a fight with Kin.

1990s
Kin spots an impoverished and crippled Hong on the streets, and gives him a lowly job at his restaurant.

Hong poisons Kin and his family during a company dinner. Kin and Gwan survived, but their son did not. Kin deduces that Hong is the culprit.

Kin sets a trap for Hong and have him arrested in Malaysia. Hong is sentenced to death. Kin persuades Bong to allow Hong's son to visit him one final time.

After Hong is executed, Gwan separates from Kin and leaves for Ethiopia. Kin says he will wait for her at the church where they got married exactly ten years to the day.

Before the ten year deadline, Kin appears on a retrospective of the tv show where he first met Gwan. Kin makes a touching plea for Gwan to return.

Present

The story comes out of flashback to the present.

Gwan calls to tell Kin she is coming home. While rushing to the airport, Kin gets into a car crash. Later, news reports indicate that Ethiopia has suffered a massive earthquake and Gwan is amongst the missing. Kin clings to the hope that Gwan will return on their ten year deadline.

On the ten year deadline, Kin heads to the church and waits for Gwan.  After midnight, a disappointed Kin falls asleep on a pew. A lady in red, visible only from the waist down appears. She approaches the sleeping Kin and leaves him a note.

Kin wakes up and finds the note which implores him to forget Gwan and move on. Kin desperately calls out Gwan’s name.

Ending
There were many speculations as to the identity of the lady in red, from Kin’s sister to Gwan herself, and even her dead spirit.

25 years after the series finale aired, lead actor Felix Wong confirmed that the lady in red was Kin's adopted sister Ling, and that Gwan had already died in Ethiopia.

Filming
Principal filming occurred in Hong Kong with some scenes set in Macau. Extensive filming also took place in Malaysia; notable locations filmed include Kuala Lumpur railway station, Chin Swee Caves Temple, Genting Highlands, and Christ Church Malacca.

Notes
1. A passing reference to the murder of Vincent Chin is made as having occurred months ago in the US.

External links

References 

TVB dramas
1989 Hong Kong television series debuts
1989 Hong Kong television series endings
Cantonese-language television shows